The Philip Glass Ensemble is an American musical group founded by composer Philip Glass in 1968 to serve as a performance outlet for his experimental minimalist music. The ensemble continues to perform and record to this day, under the musical direction of keyboardist Michael Riesman.

The Ensemble's instrumentation became a hallmark of Glass's early minimalist style. While the ensemble's instrumentation has varied over the years, it has generally consisted of amplified woodwinds (typically saxophones, flutes, and bass clarinet), keyboard synthesizers, and solo soprano voice (singing solfeggio). 

After Glass wrote his first opera, Einstein on the Beach, for the ensemble in 1976, he began to compose for other instrumentation more frequently, but he still retains the core ensemble instrumentation. 

In 2011, individuals from the ensemble performed a series of concerts in an installation at the Museum of Modern Art in the Temple of Dendur exhibit. From 2012 until late 2015 the ensemble has presented, along with many other performers, a revival of Einstein on the Beach which opened in Montpellier, France in 2012. 

In 2013 the ensemble began to perform Glass's opera, La Belle et la Bête again.  The opera is set to the visuals of the 1946 Jean Cocteau film, with the help of four vocalists. In early September 2014 the ensemble performed with Steve Reich and other musicians at the Brooklyn Academy of Music's "Next Wave Festival." It had been over thirty years since Glass and Reich had shared a stage.

In February 2018, the ensemble performed with the San Francisco Girls Chorus at Carnegie Hall. They performed the ninety-minute Music With Changing Parts, the work's debut performance with women's chorus and an extremely important concert as this piece is considered to have changed music in the 1970s. Glass has also collaborated with them on their most recent album, Final Answer, and many of his works are featured in performance by SFGC (artistically directed by Ensemble vocalist and keyboardist Lisa Bielawa).

Members
 Michael Riesman, keyboards
 Philip Glass, keyboards
 Jon Gibson, woodwinds
 Dan Dryden, audio engineer
 Eleanor Sandresky, keyboards
 Nelson Padgett, keyboards
 Ted Baker, keyboards
 Lisa Bielawa, voice
 Andrew Sterman, woodwinds
 Mick Rossi, percussion, keyboards
 Frank Cassara, percussion
 Peter Hess, woodwinds
 Dan Bora, audio engineer
 Ryan Kelly, onstage audio engineer

Featured vocalists in La Belle et la Bête
 Gregory Purnhagen, baritone
 Peter Stewart, bass
 Marie Mascari, soprano
 Hai-Ting Chin, mezzo-soprano
 Alexandra Montano, mezzo-soprano (deceased)
 Janice Felty, mezzo-soprano (still active in the opera world)
 Anna-Maria Martinez, soprano (still active in the opera world)

Former members
 Stephen Erb, audio engineer
 Martin Goldray, keyboards
 Bob Telson, keyboards
 Steve Reich, keyboards
 Art Murphy, keyboards
 Steve Chambers, keyboards
 James Tenney, keyboards
 Robert Prado, trumpet, flute, and keyboards
 Richard Peck, woodwinds
 Jack Kripl, woodwinds
 Richard Landry, woodwinds
 David Crowell, woodwinds
 Joan La Barbara, voice and keyboards
 Iris Hiskey, voice and keyboards
 Dora Ohrenstein, voice and keyboards
 Barbara Benary, violin and voice
 David Behrman, viola
 Beverly Lauridsen, cello
 Seymour Barab, cello
 Kurt Munkacsi, audio engineer (now a studio producer)

Films
 1982 –  Koyaanisqatsi.  Directed by Godfrey Reggio.
 1983 – Philip Glass.  From Four American Composers. Directed by Peter Greenaway.
 1988 – Powaqqatsi. Directed by Godfrey Reggio.
 2002 – Naqoyqatsi. Directed by Godfrey Reggio.
 2008 – Glass: A Portrait of Philip in Twelve Parts. Directed by Scott Hicks.

References

External links
 

Ensemble
American experimental musical groups
American classical music groups
Contemporary classical music ensembles
Musical groups established in 1968